Ossie Lambert (23 August 1926 – 13 April 2009) was an Australian cricketer. He played twenty-four first-class matches for New South Wales between 1950/51 and 1956/57.

See also
 List of New South Wales representative cricketers

References

External links
 

1926 births
2009 deaths
Australian cricketers
New South Wales cricketers
Cricketers from Newcastle, New South Wales